Plantaže (MNSE: PLAP) is a Montenegrin wine and grape brandy producer.

Overview
AD Plantaže, a joint stock company presently incorporated into Holding company "Agrokombinat 13 jul", is the biggest Montenegrin viticultural and winemaking company, and one of the biggest companies in Montenegro overall. The company is based in the Montenegrin capital of Podgorica.

It was founded in 1963, and deals with the production of wine and table grapes, peach, production and distribution of wine and grape brandies, fish farming, catering and retail trade. The most important segment of the company is related to the production of grapes and wine, and it owns one of the largest vineyards in Europe with over  surface, covered with more than 11 million grapevines. The vineyards are situated in the Ćemovsko polje, a flat and sunny area located south of Podgorica.

AD Plantaže is one of the largest producers of grapes and wine in the region, with an annual production of wine grapes close to 22 million kg, and 17 million bottles sold annually. The company exports its products to over 30 countries, and is the market leader in its sector in the Balkans region.

Products

Wines

 Red wines:
 Vranac
 Vranac Pro Corde
 Merlot
 Cabernet
 White wines:
 Chardonnay
 Krstač

Grape brandies

 Montenegrin Grape Brandy (Lozova rakija)
 Prvijenac
 Kruna

References

External links
 Official Website
 Listing on the Montenegro Stock Exchange 

Wineries of Montenegro